Africa is a 2019 Israeli drama film directed by Oren Gerner. The film premiered at the 2019 Toronto International Film Festival. It was nominated for the Ophir Award for Best Film.

Cast
 Maya Gerner as Maya
 Meir Gerner as Meir
 Oren Gerner as Oren

References

External links
 

2019 films
2019 drama films
Israeli drama films
2010s Hebrew-language films